The 1945 Colorado A&M Aggies football team represented Colorado State College of Agriculture and Mechanic Arts in the Mountain States Conference (MSC) during the 1945 college football season.  In their second season under head coach Julius Wagner, the Aggies compiled a 2–5–1 record (0–4 against MSC opponents), finished last in the MSC, and were outscored by a total of 179 to 89.

Schedule

References

Colorado AandM
Colorado State Rams football seasons
Colorado AandM Aggies football